Tōjō Station is the name of two train stations in Japan:

 Tōjō Station (Aichi) (東上駅)
 Tōjō Station (Hiroshima) (東城駅)